Martha Clark may refer to:

Martha Fuller Clark (born 1942), member of the New Hampshire Senate
Martha Strickland Clark (1853–1935), American lawyer

See also
Martha Clarke (born 1944), American theater director and choreographer
Martha Clark Kent, fictional character in Superman stories